Ambitious (Spanish: Ambiciosa) is a 1976 Spanish drama film directed by Pedro Lazaga and starring Teresa Rabal, José Bódalo and Manuel Zarzo.

Cast
 Teresa Rabal as Juana 
 José Bódalo as D. Matías 
 Manuel Zarzo as Esteban 
 Didi Sherman as Diana 
 Manuel Alexandre as Mariano 
 May Heatherly as Margarita 
 Elisa Montés as Amparo 
 Fernando Hilbeck
 Rosa Valenty as Françoise 
 Carmen Mínguez
 Fernando E. Romero
 José Canalejas
 Florinda Chico as Jacoba 
 Tony Isbert as Alberto 
 Luis Rico
 Cecilia Trevin
 Luis González Páramo
 Mari Carmen Duque
 Clotilde Sola
 Alfredo Enríquez
 Remigio Sacristán
 Milo Quesada
 Araceli Conde
 Concha Rabal
 Mery Leyva
 José Luis Lizalde
 Gaby Álvarez

References

Bibliography 
 Àngel Comas. Diccionari de llargmetratges: el cinema a Catalunnya després del franquisme, 1975-2003. Cossetània Edicions, 2003.

External links 
 

1976 films
Spanish erotic drama films
1970s erotic drama films
1970s Spanish-language films
Films directed by Pedro Lazaga
Suevia Films films
1976 drama films
1970s Spanish films